Morgan Cadwell Pearson (born September 22, 1993) is an American professional triathlete who won a silver medal in the mixed relay event at the 2020 Summer Olympics.

Raised in the New Vernon section of Harding Township, New Jersey, Pearson began running competitively as a student at Delbarton School. He is the son of former Valeant Pharmaceuticals CEO J. Michael Pearson.

Pearson competed in cross-country and track and field, and ran collegiately for the University of Colorado, where he was a seven-time All-American. He currently resides and trains in Boulder, Colorado.

He won a bronze medal at the 2021 World Triathlon Championship Series Yokohama and a silver at Leeds, which allowed him to qualify for the 2020 Summer Olympics.  

At the Olympic Games Men's Triathlon, with the start moved to 6:30 a.m. because of heat, Morgan swam and rode well but at Transition 2 had to wait 15 seconds in the Penalty area for an infraction incurred at Transition 1.  Morgan finished 42nd overall, 7 minutes 1 second behind the winner, in a race, for all competitors, defined by the tough heat and humidity conditions of the running section.

References

1993 births
Living people
American male triathletes
Delbarton School alumni
Sportspeople from Morris County, New Jersey
Triathletes at the 2020 Summer Olympics
Olympic triathletes of the United States
Duke Blue Devils men's track and field athletes
Colorado Buffaloes men's track and field athletes
Colorado Buffaloes men's cross country runners
People from Harding Township, New Jersey
Medalists at the 2020 Summer Olympics
Olympic silver medalists for the United States in triathlon
20th-century American people
21st-century American people